Arturo Sabbadin (born 11 August 1939) is an Italian former road cyclist.

Career achievements

Major results
1959
 1st Giro del Mendrisiotto
1961
 1st  Road race, National Road Championships

Grand Tour general classification results timeline

References

External links

1939 births
Living people
Italian male cyclists
Cyclists from the Metropolitan City of Venice
People from Mirano